Humayun (1508–1556) was a Mughal Emperor.

Hamayoun, Hamayun, Homayoun, Homayun, Humayoun and Humayun may also refer to:

Humayun Khan (disambiguation)
Hakim Humam (died 1595), Mughal official, originally known as Humayun
Humayun (film), a 1945 Indian film about the emperor
Humayun (mode), a Dastāh of Persian music
Dîvân-ı Hümâyûn, the de facto cabinet of the Ottoman Empire
Humayun Ahmed, Bangladeshi writer, filmmaker, director, novelist
Humayun Azad, Bangladeshi author and poet

Places
Afghanistan
Hamayun, Afghanistan
Iran
Homayun, Kurdistan
Homayun, South Khorasan
Homayun, Zanjan

See also
 Homayoun, a given name and surname